The 1995 Badminton Asian Cup was the third edition of Badminton Asian Cup. It was held in Xinxing Gymnasium, Qingdao, China from 14 to 18 June with total prize money of US$130,000. Chinese team won titles in all the doubles events while Indonesia and South Korea won the men's singles and women's singly title respectively.

Medalists

Medal table

Results

Semifinals 
Some of the entries are missing, you can help Wikipedia by adding the missing information with reliable source.

Finals

References 

Badminton tournaments in China
1995 in badminton
1995 in Chinese sport
International sports competitions hosted by China